Igawilo is an administrative ward in the Mbeya Urban district of the Mbeya Region of Tanzania. In 2016 the Tanzania National Bureau of Statistics report there were 19,067 people in the ward, from 17,300 in 2012.

Neighborhoods 
The ward has 4 neighborhoods.
 Chemchem
 Mponja
 Mwanyanje
 Sokoni

References 

Wards of Mbeya Region